This is a list of islands of Kuwait. Kuwait has ten islands (including one former island). They are indicated on the NASA satellite image and listed in the table in order from north to south:

See also
Geography of Kuwait
List of islands

External links
map of maritime boundaries

Kuwait
Islands